Ray Obiedo (born January 27, 1952 in Richmond, California) is an American contemporary jazz guitarist.

Obiedo grew up in Richmond, California, a graduate of  John F. Kennedy High School, and began playing guitar at age 17. Initially he played both jazz and R&B, appearing on record with Herbie Hancock, Julian Priester, and Sheila E. He was the leader of the jazz fusion group Kick and the rock band Rhythmus 21. In 1989 he signed with Windham Hill Records, with whom he released five albums in eight years.

Discography

As leader
 Perfect Crime (Windham Hill, 1989)
 Iguana (Windham Hill, 1990) U.S. Top Contemporary Jazz Albums No. 10
 Sticks & Stones (Windham Hill, 1993) U.S. Contemporary Jazz No. 7
 Zulaya (Windham Hill, 1995) U.S. Contemporary Jazz No. 22
 Sweet Summer Days (Windham Hill, 1997)
 Modern World (Domo, 1999)
 There Goes That (Rhythmus, 2014)
 Latin Jazz Project, Vol. 1 (Rhythmus, 2016)
 Carousel (Rhythmus, 2019)
 Latin Jazz Project, Vol. 2 (Rhythmus, 2021)

With Bill Summers & Summers Heat
 Cayenne (Prestige, 1977)
 Feel the Heat (Prestige, 1977)
 On Sunshine (Prestige, 1978)
 Straight to the Bank (Prestige, 1978)
 Call It What You Want (MCA, 1981)
 Jam the Box (MCA, 1981)
 Seventeen (MCA, 1982)

With Pete Escovedo
 Solo Two (Fantasy, 1977)
 Happy Together (Fantasy, 1978)
 The Island (Esgo, 1982)
 Yesterday's Dreams, Tomorrow's Memories (Esgo, 1985)
 Flying South (Concord, 1995)
 E Street (Concord, 1997)
 E Music (Concord Picante, 2000)
 Live at Stern Grove (Concord, 2012)

With Herbie Hancock
 Feets, Don't Fail Me Now (CBS, 1979)
 Directstep (CBS Sony, 1979)
 Butterfly with Kimiko Kasai & Herbie Hancock (CBS Sony, 1979)
 Tokyo Sunlight (Megadisc, 2002)

With Sheila E.
 Sex Cymbal (Warner Bros., 1991)
 Writes of Passage (Concord, 2000)
 Heaven (Concord, 2001)

As sideman
 Johnny "Hammond" Smith Forever Taurus (Milestone) 1976
 Bobbi Humphrey Tailor Made (Epic) 1977
 Julian Priester Polarization (ECM) 1977 (as composer/sideman)
 Eddie Henderson Mahal (Capitol) 1978
 Paul Jackson Black Octopus (Toshiba-EMI) 1978
 George Duke Master of the Game (Epic) 1979
 Michael Paulo Tats in the Rainbow (Trio-Kenwood) 1979
 Mark Soskin Rhythm Vision (Prestige) 1980
 The Waters Watercolors (Arista) 1980
 Rodney Franklin Endless Flight (CBS) 1981
 The Whispers Love Is Where You Find It (Solar) 1981
 Carrie Lucas Still in Love (Solar) 1982 (as co-producer/composer/sideman)
 Holly Near Speed of Light (Redwood) 1982
 Cornelius Bumpus Beacon (Broadbeach) 1983
 The Whispers Love for Love (Solar) 1983 (as co-producer/composer/sideman)
 Linda Tillery Secrets (Redwood) 1985 (as producer/composer/sideman)
 R.O.A.R. R.O.A.R. (CBS) 1985
 L.J. Reynolds Tell Me You Will (Fantasy) 1987
 Brenda Russell Kiss Me With the Wind (A&M) 1990
 Lou Rawls It's Supposed to Be Fun (Blue Note) 1990
 Rad Venus Drops (Soulciety) 1993
 Claudia Villela Asa Verde (Taina) 1994
 Marc Russo The Window (JVC) 1994
 Rad Gotta Be (Soulciety) 1994
 David Garibaldi The Funky Beat (1 & 2) (Manhattan) 1996 (as composer & sideman)
 Grover Washington, Jr. Soulful Strut (Columbia) 1996
 David K Mathews Down With It 1998 (as producer/engineer/sideman)
 The Whispers Love for Love (Solar) 1998 (as co-producer/composer/sideman)
 Braxton Brothers Now & Forever (Windham Hill) 1999
 Delfonics Forever New (Volt) 1999
 Marion Meadows Next to You (Heads Up) 2000 (as co-producer/composer/sideman)
 Tom Grant Tune It In (Windham Hill) 2000 (as producer/engineer/sideman)
 Zigaboo Modeliste Zigaboo (JZM) 2000
 Freda Payne Come See About Me (Volt) 2001
 Marion Meadows In Deep (Heads Up) 2002
 Rad Live Live in Paris (7 Bridges) 2003
 Intuit Intuit (Compost) 2004 (as co-producer/engineer/sideman)
 Intuit Planet Birth (Compost) 2004 (as co-producer/engineer/sideman)
 Joyce Cooling This Girl's Got to Play (Narada) 2004 (as engineer/sideman)
 Joyce Cooling Revolving Door (Narada) 2006 (as engineer/sideman)
 Doc Kupka Doc Goes Hollywood (Strokeland) 2008
 Rad Live in Japan (7 Bridges) 2008
 Intuit Voyage No. 2 (In + Out) 2011
 Amikaeyla Being in Love (Rootsjazz) 2012 (as co-producer /engineer/sideman)
 George Duke Complete 1970's Epic Albums (Epic) 2012
 Pacific Mambo Orchestra Pacific Mambo Orchestra (PMO) 2012

References

External links
 
 

20th-century American guitarists
21st-century American guitarists
American jazz guitarists
Windham Hill Records artists
Smooth jazz guitarists
Guitarists from California
Living people
1952 births
Jazz musicians from California
Domo Records artists